The Pocket Guide to the Apocalypse: The Official Field Manual for the End of the World, written by Jason Boyett and published by Relevant Books, is a caricature of eschatology, the apocalypse, and the end times.

Contents
Chapters in the book include:
 the "Apocalyptionary" (a glossary of The End)
 "The End is Near" (a timeline of failed end-of-the-world predictions)
 "Know Your Potential Antichrists" (a gallery of Antichrist candidates)
 "Fun with Eschatology" (an introduction to apocalyptic theory)
 "Armageddon Grab-Bag"

References

External links
Jason Boyett, personal blog site of author
Blog review of The Pocket Guide to the Apocalypse

Comedy books
Apocalyptic fiction